Euphaedra vetusta, the green Themis forester, is a butterfly in the family Nymphalidae. It is found in Sierra Leone, Ivory Coast and Ghana. The habitat consists of dense forests.

Adults are attracted to fallen fruit.

Similar species
Other members of themis species group q.v.

References

Butterflies described in 1871
vetusta
Butterflies of Africa
Taxa named by Arthur Gardiner Butler